Saad Abdul-Hameed (born  21 October 1968) is an Iraqi former international football player. An ethnic Assyrian, Benyamin played for Al-Zawraa, Al-Quwa Al-Jawiya, Al-Shorta, and Club Africain. In 1988, Saad was called up to play for the Iraqi U-19 in the Asian Youth Championship in Doha, Qatar, where the team won the tournament and qualified to play in the 1989 World Youth Championship in Saudi Arabia. In 1988, he was given his international debut and become a permanent fixture of the Iraqi national team until 1994.

Saad was an attacking left back or left side of midfield. He started his career at Al-Shabab alongside captain Basil Gorgis, Hameed Rasheed and Ismail Mohammed.

After the large flow of top players turning professional and moving abroad, Saad decided to move, playing for Tunisian team Club Africain during the mid-90s.

References

Iraqi footballers
Iraqi expatriate footballers
Al-Zawraa SC players
Living people
Al-Shorta SC players
Association football defenders
Assyrian footballers
1968 births
Association football midfielders
Al-Zawraa SC managers
Iraqi football managers
Iraq international footballers